Abdelkader Aamara ( - born 28 January 1962, in Bouarfa) is a Moroccan politician of the Justice and Development Party and its Chief Treasurer. On 3 January 2012, he was nominated as the Minister for Industry, Trade and New Technologies in the cabinet of Abdelilah Benkirane. Between 2013 and 2016, he was the Minister for Energy, Mines, Water and Environment and since 5 April 2017, he has been the minister for Equipment, Transport and Water Logistics in the cabinet of El Othmani. Between 2nd & 20th August 2018, he took an interim position as the Minister for Economy and Finance following the firing of Mohamed Boussaid.  He has served as MP for Salé (re-elected in 2007, 2011) since 2002 and is  a professor at the Hassan II Institute of Agronomy in Rabat, from which he graduated in 1986.

Career 
A laureate and then, since 1986, professor at the Rabat Hassan II Veterinary and Agronomical Institute, Abdelkader Amara obtained his doctorate in the same year before leaving for France in 1989.

Amara has been a member of the General Secretariat, Treasurer and Former President of the Central Framework Committee of the Justice and Development Party since 1997. He has also been an expert at the World Science Organisation, based in Sweden, for the last ten years.

As a Councillor in the town of Salé since 2002, Amara is also a former President of the Productive Sectors Commission in the Chamber of Representatives and an ex-member of the chamber's bureau.

As Vice-President of the Justice and Development Party group in the chamber in charge of communications, Amara is also a founding member of the Association of Moroccan Parliamentarians Against Corruption and a former member of the Administrative Commission of the National Higher Education Trade Union.

Amara is the Vice-President of the World Forum of Islamic Parliamentarians, of which he is a founding member, and also a founding member of the International Alliance for the Support of Al-Qods and Palestine (Istanbul).

Abdelkader Amara is married and a father of three children.

He tested positive for SARS-CoV-2 on 14 March 2020 during the COVID-19 pandemic in Morocco.

See also
Cabinet of Morocco
Justice and Development Party
Politics of Morocco

References

External links
Ministry of Industry
Ministry of Trade
eGov.ma

Living people
Government ministers of Morocco
1962 births
People from Bouarfa, Morocco
Moroccan educators
Justice and Development Party (Morocco) politicians